The 118th United States Congress began on January 3, 2023. There were seven new senators (two Democrats, five Republicans) and 74 new representatives (34 Democrats, 40 Republicans), as well as one new delegate (a Republican), at the start of its first session. Additionally, one senator (a Republican) and one representative (a Democrat) have taken office in order to fill vacancies during the 118th Congress.

Due to redistricting after the 2020 census, 18 representatives were elected from newly established congressional districts.

The president of the House Democratic freshman class is Robert Garcia of California, while the president of the House Republican freshman class is Russell Fry of South Carolina. Additionally, the Democratic Freshmen Leadership Representative is Jasmine Crockett of Texas, and the Republican's freshmen liaison is Erin Houchin of Indiana.

Senate

Took office January 3, 2023

Took office during the 118th Congress

House of Representatives

Took office January 3, 2023

Non-voting delegates

Took office during the 118th Congress

See also 
 List of United States senators in the 118th Congress
 List of members of the United States House of Representatives in the 118th Congress by seniority

Notes

References 

Freshman class members
118